Tej Narayan Pandey is an Indian politician who represents Ayodhya as a Member of the Uttar Pradesh Legislative Assembly. He is a member of Samajwadi party. He is elected as MLA of 2012 Uttar Pradesh Legislative Assembly election from Ayodhya.

On 7 February 2013, he was assigned the minister of state for entertainment tax (independent Charge) in the newly elected Akhilesh Yadav government. On 17 June 2014, Pandey stepped down from Akhilesh Yadav ministry, while continuing to be part of party executive committee.

Early life
Pandey was born to Rajbhushan and hails from Ayodhya in Uttar Pradesh. He did his post graduation from Lucknow University in 2003.

Political career 

He joined Samajwadi party in 1998. He was elected vice-president of Lucknow University in 2004. He is the member of Akhilesh yadav "Team Eleven". Tej Narain Pandey (aka Pawan Pandey) was among the rare chosen few from Akhilesh's band of followers, who got the party ticket to contest from the important seat of Ayodhya. Pandey, former university of Lucknow student union vice-president, was in the news all through the elections as he got married during the election campaign. His wedding reception was closely monitored and video-filmed by the Election Commission suspecting violation of the code of conduct.

Having defeated to BJP veteran Lallu Singh from Ayodhya, the first time any party has done so after the Babri Masjid demolition on 6 December 1992, Pandey would now be in news long after the government is formed. While defeating BJP in the symbolically important Ayodhya seat, Pandey is also very close to Akhilesh.

SP insiders say that around 2003–04, when Akhilesh was emerging out of his fathers shadow, Pandey grew close to him by the virtue of being in Lucknow and hanging around Akhilesh's residence. He was later believed to have provided inputs to Akhilesh's speeches and also played a coordinator for all student union leaders from UP who wanted to meet Akhilesh.

His efforts are praised by people of faizabad for approval of Medical college in Faizabad.

A former student union leader of Lucknow University, Pandey is a first-time MLA from Ayodhya in Faizabad district. "I will continue working to strengthen Samajwadi Party, Netaji (Mulayam) and Akhilesh with a target to ensure that Akhilesh becomes CM again after the 2017 polls. The SP is in my heart and spirit and that cannot be removed by merely a letter issued by Shivpal Yadav," he said. Pandey is the seventh Akhilesh aide in a prominent post to be expelled by Shivpal within a month.

In 2012, when there was no rift, Pandey had earned praise from both Mulayam and Akhilesh after winning his seat against the BJP's Lallu Singh in Ayodhya, a safforn stronghold. Lallu Singh had been MLA from the seat for five consecutive terms. The giantkiller was rewarded with a berth, initially made MoS for Entertainment Tax. After the party's poor showing in the 2014 Lok Sabha polls, Pandey was removed as minister along with three others in June 2014. He regained Akhilesh's confidence, however, as was evident when he was reinducted in 2015, this time as minister of state for forests.

According to his political advisor Ankaj Tiwari : Before contesting his first assembly election, Pandey had been an active student leader at Lucknow University, elected vice-president of the students’ union in 2004-2005 as candidate of the Samajwadi Party's student wing, Chhatra Sabha. He graduated from student politics to join his maternal uncle Jai Shanker Pandey, who has been district president of Samajwadi Party in Faizabad since the foundation of the party.

He lost his seat in the 2017 Uttar Pradesh Assembly election to Ved Prakash Gupta of the Bharatiya Janata Party.

References

1980s births
Members of the Uttar Pradesh Legislative Assembly
Place of birth missing (living people)
Apna Dal politicians
Samajwadi Party politicians
Uttar Pradesh politicians
21st-century Indian politicians
Living people
Year of birth missing (living people)